Lath Branch is a stream in Bourbon County, Kansas, in the United States.

Lath Branch was named from the fact a pioneer craftsman produced lath near this creek.

See also
List of rivers of Kansas

References

Rivers of Bourbon County, Kansas
Rivers of Kansas